Hastings City Hall, formerly the Dakota County Courthouse, is a historic government building in Hastings, Minnesota, United States, completed in 1871.  It was the original courthouse for Dakota County and now serves as city hall.  It was designed by A.M. Radcliff, one of Minnesota's first architects, in an Italian Villa style.  Although an addition built in 1955 in an entirely different style damaged the building's integrity, the building remains a prominent structure in downtown Hastings.  The courthouse served as the seat of Dakota County government from 1871 until September 1974, when the county commissioners held their last meeting in the building.  It became the Hastings City Hall in 1993.

See also
 National Register of Historic Places listings in Dakota County, Minnesota

References

External links

 Hastings City Hall

Buildings and structures in Hastings, Minnesota
County courthouses in Minnesota
Courthouses on the National Register of Historic Places in Minnesota
Former courthouses in Minnesota
Government buildings completed in 1871
Italianate architecture in Minnesota
City and town halls in Minnesota
National Register of Historic Places in Dakota County, Minnesota
City and town halls on the National Register of Historic Places in Minnesota